This List of Florida Gators men's golfers on the PGA Tour includes notable athletes who played for the Florida Gators men's golf team that represents the University of Florida in Gainesville, Florida, and who play or have played golf professionally. These University of Florida alumni played on the PGA Tour and/or on the affiliated Korn Ferry Tour or PGA Tour Champions. The table lists their wins on these tours and other notable golfing achievements.

See also 

 Florida Gators
 List of Florida Gators women's golfers on the LPGA Tour
 List of University of Florida alumni
 List of University of Florida Athletic Hall of Fame members

 
Golfers, men's